Revolutions per Minute is the second studio album by American hip hop duo Reflection Eternal, released May 18, 2010, on Blacksmith Records and Rawkus Records. Composed of rapper Talib Kweli and DJ/hip hop producer Hi-Tek, it is the duo's follow-up to their collaborative debut Train of Thought (2000).

The album debuted at number 18 on the US Billboard 200 chart, selling 21,000 copies in its first week. Upon its release, Revolutions per Minute received generally positive reviews from most music critics.

Background
Like the first album, Revolutions per Minute was recorded at Electric Lady Studios. It is their second album after a 10-year hiatus. Hi-Tek produced the entire album. The album features five singles: "Back Again", "Just Begun" with Mos Def, Jay Electronica and J. Cole, "In This World", "Strangers (Paranoid)" with Bun B, and "Midnight Hour" with Estelle. The album was released May 18, 2010 on Blacksmith Records and Rawkus Records.

Reception

Commercial performance
The album debuted at number 18 on the US Billboard 200 chart with first-week sales of 21,000 copies. It also entered at number five on Billboards R&B/Hip-Hop Albums, at number three on its Rap Albums, and at number 11 on its Digital Albums chart.

Critical response
Upon its release, the album received positive reviews from most music critics, based on an aggregate score of 80/100 from Metacritic. Allmusic writer Gregory Heaney commended Kweli's and Hi-Tek's musical chemistry and wrote "Hi-Tek's soul-infused beats create the perfect laid-back atmosphere for Kweli's casual verbal acrobatics, crafting beats that bring the listener into the group's chilled-out space with their minimal aesthetic". Steve Juon of RapReviews gave it a 9/10 rating and praised Kweli's rapping, stating "Kweli is using his keen powers of observation to see the world for what it really is, and then translate that knowledge into a musical form you can simultaneously enjoy and learn from". Exclaim!s Anupa Mistry wrote that Revolutions per Minute is "doused in their working chemistry". Boston Phoenix writer Chris Faraone gave it 3 out of 4 stars and stated "The chemistry between these two remains bubbling". HipHopDX writer Kathy Iandoli gave it 4 out of 5 stars and wrote that it "displays the evolution of both the emcee and the deejay". Giving it an 8/10 rating, PopMatters writer Dave Heaton praised Kweli's lyrics concerning the importance of money in life, building a career in hip hop, the differences between celebrity and work, and the former's effect on a person, stating:

Giving it 4 out of 5 stars, Slant Magazine writer M.T. Richards described the album as "brainy, energizing stuff" and praised Kweli's rapping, stating "Sinking his no-frills flow into calm, bassy tracks, Kweli lands punchline after punchline with the kind of finesse Jay and Common could only dream of". The A.V. Clubs Nathan Rabin gave the album a B rating and wrote "Hi-Tek lacks a trademark style, but his chemistry with Kweli remains potent, even when Minute doesn't hit the heights of the duo's debut". Mosi Reeves of Spin gave the album 3½ out of 5 stars and viewed Hi-Tek's "jazz-inflected riffs and soulful vibes" as complementary to Kweli's "mercurial" style, stating "congenial beats balance intricately daring rhymes". Alternative Press writer Casey Boland gave it four out of five stars and viewed it as an improvement for Hi-Tek's producing and Kweli's rapping, stating "he sounds at home with Hi-Tek. His cadence has never locked so tightly with the tune, his lyrical flow never so sinuous". Henry Adaso of About.com noted a "musical maturation" by the duo and wrote that the album "finds Kweli masterfully marrying the physical with the philosophical atop Hi-Tek's rich palette of headphone music". Pitchfork Media's Nate Patrin gave Revolutions per Minute a 7.5/10 rating and commended its "conscious yet unpretentious lyricism delivered with acrobatic dexterity over on-point, no-gimmick beats".

Track listing
All songs produced by Hi-Tek.

Personnel
Credits for Revolutions per Minute adapted from Allmusic.

 Naim Ali – A&R  
 Steve Baughman – Mixing  
 Ski Beats – Engineer  
 Austin Briggs – Engineer  
 Erik "Baby Jesus" Coomes – Bass, Guitar  
 Affion Crockett – Skit  
 Dave Dar – Engineer  
 Nabil Elderkin – Photography  
 Estelle – Arranger  
 Ethan Gouldbourne – Keyboards  
 T. Greene – Arranger, Composer  
 Hi-Tek – Producer, Engineer, Executive Producer, Mixing, Scratching, Skit, Group Member  
 Daniel Jones – Keyboards  
 Joseph I – Stylist  
 Liza Joseph – A&R  
 Samuel Kalandjianv – Engineer, Assistant Engineer  
 Eddie Krakaur – Engineer  
 Talib Kweli – Executive Producer, Vocals, Group Member  
Belinda Lipscomb – Composer, Vocals  

 Zach Lucas – Sax (Tenor)  
 Christopher Lee Lyons – Art Direction, Design  
 Midori Nishijima – A&R  
 Neal Pogues – Mixing  
 Jack Rayner – Engineer  
 Daniel Seeff – Bass, Guitar, Composer, Producer  
 Sha Money XL – Executive Producer, Management  
 Corey Smyth – Executive Producer, Management  
 Kevin Sokolniki – Assistant  
 Chris Soper – Assistant Engineer  
 Estelle Swaray – Composer  
 Tekzilla – Vocals  
 Carolyn Tracey – Package Production  
 Imani Uzuri – Vocals  
 Pat Viala – Engineer, Mixing  
 Ellen Wakayama – Creative Director, Visual Direction  
 Denise A. Williams – Creative Director, Visual Direction  
 Young Guru – Arranger, Engineer

Charts

Weekly charts

Year-end charts

References

Talib Kweli albums
2010 albums
Rawkus Records albums
Hi-Tek albums
Albums produced by Hi-Tek
Albums recorded at Electric Lady Studios